is a dam in Ibigawa, in the Gifu Prefecture of Japan.

Dams in Gifu Prefecture
Dams completed in 1964